Kathapurushan is a 1995 Indo-Japanese Malayalam-language period drama film written and directed by Adoor Gopalakrishnan. It was produced by Gopalakrishnan himself and co-produced by NHK. The film stars Vishwanathan, Mini Nair, Aranmula Ponnamma, Narendra Prasad and Urmila Unni. Kathapurushan is a journey exploring the history of that time in the state of Kerala in India. The film won the National Film Award for Best Feature Film at the National Film Awards in 1996.

Plot

Kunjunni's (Vishwanathan) parents separate soon after his birth, and he's left to be cared by his mother, void of paternal care and affection. He is brought up by his mother with the help of his grandmother, an estate manager and his friend Meenakshi (Mini Nair), the daughter of a maid servant working in Kunjunni's house. Inspired by his Uncle (Narendra Prasad), who was initially a Gandhian, and eventually  a Marxist, Kunjunni finds himself drawn to left-wing ideologies during his studies at college, believing that communism is the answer to heal all social hardships and inequalities. Eventually he joins an extremist Marxist group, and his affairs land him in trouble. After an attack at a police station, Kunjunni is arrested and taken to court, but later acquitted of all charges.

Kunjunni finds himself maturing with experience, yet he feels lonely and disillusioned. Kunjunni tries to turn his life around, and sets off on a quest to find his childhood friend Meenakshi and he does so and marries her. Later he sells all his properties to a new rich man (Mukesh), whose father was once a servant in Kunjuni's house. Then he moves to an ordinary house and  tries to live a normal family life with his wife and son. One day, one of his old day college juniors (Jagadish), a journalist, arrives at his home for an interview. But Kunjunni denies it. Later Kujunni, with the help of his journalist friend, publishes his first story, "Karaksharangal". But due to its Marxist supporting content and revealing nature, government banned it. When Kunjunni reads this news in the newspaper with his family, he began to laugh. Then he and his family laugh together at this dirty world, which reveals that the revolution had not yet happened completely.

Awards
The film has won the following awards since its release:

1996 National Film Awards (India)
 Won - National Film Award for Best Feature Film - Adoor Gopalakrishnan
 Won - National Film Award for Best Supporting Actress - Aranmula Ponnamma

1997 Bombay International Film Festival (India)
 Won - FIPRESCI Prize - Adoor Gopalakrishnan

References

External links

1995 films
1995 drama films
Films directed by Adoor Gopalakrishnan
1990s Malayalam-language films
Best Feature Film National Film Award winners
Films featuring a Best Supporting Actress National Film Award-winning performance